Ernest Alonzo Fryers (January 25, 1913 – January 9, 1988) was a Canadian politician. He served in the Legislative Assembly of New Brunswick as member of the Liberal party from 1948 to 1952. He died at a hospital in Moncton in 1988.

References

1913 births
1988 deaths
20th-century Canadian politicians
New Brunswick Liberal Association MLAs
People from Moncton